Elachista krogeri is a moth of the family Elachistidae. It is found in Fennoscandia and northern Russia.

Adults are on wing from June to August.

References

krogeri
Moths described in 1976
Moths of Europe